Middle Polish is the period in the history of the Polish language between the 16th and 18th centuries. It evolved from Old Polish, and gave rise to Modern Polish.

In 16th century, Polish poet Jan Kochanowski proposed a set of orthographic rules and an alphabet of 48 letters and digraphs:

The letters ç, θ, θ´, θ˙, ŗ, σ, ß, ƶ corresponded to Modern Polish cz, dz, dź, dż, rz, ś, sz, ż respectively.

References
 Glanville Price (01 September 2017). Encyclopedia of the languages of Europe. Wiley-Blackwell. 520 pg. . Retrieved 30 October 2020.

Further reading
Bogdan Walczak: Zarys dziejów języka polskiego. Poznań: Kantor Wydawniczy SAWW, 1995. .

Polish language
Polish, Middle